Nucleosome assembly protein 1-like 1 is a protein that in humans is encoded by the NAP1L1 gene.

This gene encodes a member of the nucleosome assembly protein (NAP) family. This protein participates in DNA replication and may play a role in modulating chromatin formation and contribute to the regulation of cell proliferation. Alternative splicing of this gene results in several transcript variants; however, not all have been fully described.

References

Further reading

Human proteins